Rock Glacier is a rock glacier on the south flank of the Jakupica range below the eastern face of Solunska Glava in the central part of North Macedonia in Čaška Municipality.

Geography 
The glacier's total area is 0.25 km2, which makes it one of the largest in the Balkans. As a result of the freezing and melting processes of the ice in the shattered dolomite outcrops, there are portions and blocks moving towards a segment higher than 500 m and gradually descend through seven whetstones forming four creeps in the segment above the primary source area of the Babuna River, Bogomila Falls.

See also 
 Jakupica

References 

Glaciers of North Macedonia
Landforms of North Macedonia
Čaška Municipality